Sunrun Inc. is an American provider of photovoltaic systems and battery energy storage products, primarily for residential customers. The company was established in 2007 and is headquartered in San Francisco, California.

Since its inception, the company has focused primarily on a power purchase agreement (PPA) business model where Sunrun installs and maintains a solar system on a customers home, then sells power to the customer at an agreed upon rate for a 20- or 25-year term. This business model allows property owners to install solar at no upfront cost, but without the benefits (such as tax breaks) or some risks that come with being the owner of the system. The company has a sizable network of partners, including Costco and The Home Depot, who allow Sunrun to market to customers inside their stores.

In 2021, the company installed solar systems capable of generating 792 megawatts of power, and in the history of the company, had installed a total of 4.68 gigawatts of power for over 660 thousand customers.

History 
Sunrun was co-founded in January 2007 by Lynn Jurich, Ed Fenster, and Nat Kreamer with a business model in which it offered customers either a lease or a Power Purchase Agreement (PPA) business model whereby homeowners paid for electricity usage but did not buy solar panels outright, reducing the initial capital outlay required by the homeowner. Sunrun is responsible for installation, maintenance, monitoring and repairs.

The company raised $12 million in venture capital funding from a group of investors including Foundation Capital in June 2008. In 2009, Sunrun closed a Series B round of funding for $18 million led by Accel Partners and joined by Foundation Capital. The company also received an additional commitment of $90 million in tax equity from U.S. Bancorp in 2009, following the $105 million in project financing from the bank in 2008. In June 2010, Sunrun struck a deal with PG&E for $100 million. Following the deal, the company announced $55 million in fresh capital from Sequoia Capital.In May 2014, the company raised $150 million.

In 2015 Sunrun went public on the Nasdaq stock exchange at $14 per share, with an initial market capitalization of $1.36 billion and launched its BrightBox battery energy storage product in the state of Hawaii.  The next year it started selling BrightBox in California.

In January 2017, Sunrun announced a strategic partnership with National Grid plc.

The Wall Street Journal reported in May 2017 that the Securities and Exchange Commission (SEC) was investigating Sunrun and SolarCity, with regard to whether they adequately disclosed canceled contracts, a metric that the paper said is used by investors to gauge how well such companies are performing. In 2017, cancellations of contracts with Sunrun were around 40%.

In July 2018, Sunrun expanded their solar and battery service to the island of Puerto Rico. With operations in 23 states, the District of Columbia, and Puerto Rico, Sunrun became the largest solar, storage and energy services company in America, surpassing SolarCity (now Tesla Energy).

In July 2020, Sunrun announced that it would acquire Vivint Solar for $3.2 billion. By early October 2020, the acquisition was completed following the approval by regulators and stockholders of both companies, creating a valuation of approximately $22 billion.

In February 2022, Ford announced a partnership that makes Sunrun the official installer of its bidirectional charging station for the F-150 Lightning, allowing customers to charge their truck at home, but also use the vehicle battery for backup power during a grid outage.

References

External links 
 

Energy companies established in 2007
Renewable resource companies established in 2007
2007 establishments in California
American companies established in 2007
Companies based in San Francisco
Solar energy companies of the United States
Companies listed on the Nasdaq
2015 initial public offerings